Herbert Stanley Morrison, Baron Morrison of Lambeth,  (3 January 1888 – 6 March 1965) was a British politician who held a variety of senior positions in the Cabinet as a member of the Labour Party. During the inter-war period, he was Minister of Transport during the Second MacDonald ministry, then after losing his parliamentary seat in the 1931 general election, he became Leader of the London County Council in the 1930s. After returning to the Commons, he was defeated by Clement Attlee in the 1935 Labour Party leadership election but later acted as Home Secretary in the wartime coalition.

Morrison organised Labour's victorious 1945 election campaign, and was appointed Leader of the House of Commons and acted as Attlee's deputy in the Attlee ministry of 1945–51. Attlee, Morrison, Ernest Bevin, Stafford Cripps, and initially Hugh Dalton formed the "Big Five" who dominated those governments. Morrison oversaw Labour's nationalisation programme, although he opposed Aneurin Bevan's proposals for a nationalised hospital service as part of the setting up of the National Health Service. Morrison developed his social views from his work in local politics and always emphasised the importance of public works to deal with unemployment. In the final year of Attlee's premiership, Morrison had an unhappy term as Foreign Secretary. He was hailed as "Lord Festival" for his successful leadership of the Festival of Britain, a critical and popular success in 1951 that attracted millions of visitors to fun-filled educational exhibits and events in London and across the country.

Morrison was widely expected to succeed Attlee as Labour leader but Attlee, who disliked him, postponed stepping down until 1955. Morrison, who was by then considered too old, came a poor third in the 1955 Labour Party leadership election.

Early life
Morrison was born in Stockwell, Lambeth, London, to Priscilla (née Lyon; died 1907) and Henry Morrison (died 1917), one of six children who survived infancy. Henry Morrison was a police constable, with whose Conservative political opinions his son would later come to disagree strongly.

As a baby, he permanently lost the sight in his right eye due to infection. He attended Stockwell Road Primary School and, from the age of 11, St Andrew's Church of England School. He left school at 14 to become an errand boy. His early politics were radical, and he briefly flirted with the Social Democratic Federation over the Independent Labour Party (ILP). As a conscientious objector, he worked in a market garden in Letchworth in World War One.

Political career

Early career

Morrison eventually became a pioneer leader in the London Labour Party. He was elected to the Metropolitan Borough of Hackney in 1919 when the Labour Party won control of the Borough, and he was Mayor in 1920–21. Morrison was a follower of Clapton Orient FC and became a shareholder in the club. He was elected to the London County Council (LCC) in 1922 and at the 1923 general election he became Member of Parliament (MP) for Hackney South, but lost that seat the following year when Ramsay MacDonald's first administration lost the general election.

Morrison returned to Parliament in the 1929 general election, and MacDonald appointed him Minister of Transport. Morrison, like many others in the party, was deeply disheartened by MacDonald's national government, and he lost his seat again in 1931.

London
Morrison continued to sit on the London County Council and in 1933 was elected to lead the Labour Group. He wrote a book Socialisation and Transport : the Organisation of Socialised Industries with Particular Reference to the London Passenger Transport Bill which encapsulated his ideas on nationalisation. Managers would be appointed to run monopoly industries in the public interest. He did not, however, envisage democratic control by the workers.  Unexpectedly, Labour won the 1934 LCC election and Morrison became Leader of the council. This gave him control of almost all local government services in London. His main achievements here included the unification of bus, tram and trolleybus services with the Underground, by the creation of the London Passenger Transport Board (colloquially known as London Transport) in 1933, and creating the Metropolitan Green Belt around the suburbs. He confronted the Government over its refusal to finance the replacement of Waterloo Bridge, and eventually they agreed to pay 60% of the cost of the new bridge.

In the 1935 election, Morrison was once again elected to the House of Commons and immediately challenged Attlee for the leadership of the party. He was defeated by a wide margin in the final ballot, a defeat ascribed to his unfamiliarity with the MPs who had served in the previous Parliament. Both he and his supporter Hugh Dalton put some of the blame on the Masonic New Welcome Lodge, who, they claimed, backed the third-place leadership candidate Arthur Greenwood and then switched their votes to Attlee. After losing, Morrison concentrated on his LCC work. He convinced Labour to adopt the new electioneering techniques that opponents had been using, especially using advertising agencies in the 1937 local elections.  For example, he stressed housing, education and his own leadership with posters featuring Morrison alongside children and with a backdrop of new LCC flats above slogans such as "Labour Puts Human Happiness First", "Labour Gets Things Done" and "Let Labour Finish the Job."

In 1939, Conservative MPs defeated Herbert Morrison's bill introducing "site value rating", a tax on similar lines to Land Value Tax, in the old London County Council area.

By the late 1960s, long after Morrison had left the leadership of the London County Council, London Conservatives frequently accused him of seeking to "build the Tories out of London", the implication being that the LCC would deliberately build council houses in order to affect local voting patterns. His biographers, Bernard Donoghue and George W. Jones, have written that "Morrison never said or wrote" the words attributed to him.

Wartime Coalition

In 1940, Morrison was appointed the first Minister of Supply by Winston Churchill, but shortly afterwards succeeded John Anderson as Home Secretary. Morrison's London experience in local government was particularly useful during the Blitz, and the Morrison shelter was named after him. He made radio appeals for more fire guards in December 1940 ('Britain shall not burn').

Morrison had to take many potentially unpopular and controversial decisions by the nature of wartime circumstances. On 21 January 1941, he banned the Daily Worker for opposing war with Germany and supporting the Soviet Union. The ban lasted for a total of 18 months before it was rescinded.

The arrival of black American troops caused concern in the government, leading Morrison, the Home Secretary, to comment "I am fully conscious that a difficult social problem might be created if there were a substantial number of sex relations between white women and coloured troops and the procreation of half-caste children." That was in a memorandum for the cabinet in 1942.  In 1942, Morrison was confronted with an appeal from the Central British Fund for German Jewry (now World Jewish Relief) to admit 350 Jewish children from Vichy France. Although Case Anton ensured the scheme's failure, Morrison had been reluctant to accept it beforehand, wanting to avoid provoking the ‘anti-foreign and anti-semitic feeling which was quite certainly latent in this country (and in some isolated cases not at all latent)’.

In 1943, he ran for the post of Treasurer of the Labour Party but lost a close contest to Arthur Greenwood.

Labour Government, 1945–51

Following the end of the war, Morrison was instrumental in drafting the Labour Party's 1945 manifesto Let us Face the Future. He organised the general election campaign and enlisted the help of left-wing cartoonist Philip Zec, with whom he had clashed during the early stages of the war when, as Minister of Supply, he took exception to an illustration commenting on the costs of supplying the country with petrol. Labour won a massive and unexpected victory, and Morrison was appointed Leader of the House of Commons, having switched his own seat to Lewisham East. He was the chief sponsor of the Festival of Britain.

Morrison supervised the major Labour programme of nationalising large sectors of industry. As Lord President chaired the committee on the Socialization of Industries, he followed the model that was already in place of setting up public corporations, such as the BBC in broadcasting (1927). The owners of corporate stock were given government bonds, and the government took full ownership of each affected company, consolidating it into a national monopoly. The management remained the same, only now they became public servants working for the government. For the Labour Party leadership, nationalisation was a method to consolidate national planning in their own hands. It was not designed to modernise old industries, make them efficient, or transform their organisational structure.

In July 1946, Morrison, together with US ambassador Henry F. Grady proposed "The Morrison-Grady Plan", intended to resolve the Palestine conflict, calling for federalisation under overall British trusteeship. Morrison was a longtime sympathizer with Zionism, but the plan was ultimately rejected by both Palestinians and Zionists.

Following Ernest Bevin's resignation as Foreign Secretary, Morrison took over his role, but did not feel at ease in the Foreign Office. He took an aggressive stance against Iran's nationalist Prime Minister Mohammed Mosaddeq and approved his overthrow. His tenure there was cut short by Labour's defeat in the 1951 general election, and he was appointed a Companion of Honour in November that year.

Festival of Britain

Morrison lacked a deep concern for foreign affairs, but he was an enthusiastic leader of a major domestic project, the Festival of Britain.  Starting in 1947, he was the prime mover of the 1951 fair. The original goal was to celebrate the centenary of the Great Exhibition of 1851.   However, the plans were changed. It was not to be another World Fair, and international themes were absent; even the Commonwealth was ignored. Instead, the Festival focused entirely on Britain and its achievements; it was funded chiefly by the government, with a budget of £12-million. The Conservatives gave little support. The Labour government was losing support, and the implicit goal of the festival was to give the people a feeling of successful recovery from the war's devastation, as well as promoting British science, technology, industrial design, architecture and the arts. Historian Kenneth O. Morgan says the Festival was a "triumphant success" as thousands:
flocked to the South Bank site, to wander around the Dome of Discovery, gaze at the Skylon, and generally enjoy a festival of national celebration. Up and down the land, lesser festivals enlisted much civic and voluntary enthusiasm. A people curbed by years of total war and half-crushed by austerity and gloom, showed that it had not lost the capacity for enjoying itself....Above all, the Festival made a spectacular setting as a showpiece for the inventiveness and genius of British scientists and technologists.

End of political career

Although Morrison had effectively been Attlee's heir presumptive since the 1930s, Attlee had always distrusted him. Attlee remained as Leader through the early 1950s and fought the 1955 election, finally announcing his retirement after Labour's defeat. Morrison was then 67, and was seen to be too old to embark on a new leadership role. During the leadership election, he was the interim Leader of the Labour Party. Although he stood, he finished last, by a wide margin, of the three candidates, with many of his supporters switching to Hugh Gaitskell. Gaitskell won the election, and Morrison resigned as Deputy Leader.

During the Suez Crisis, Morrison advocated unilateral action by the United Kingdom against Egypt, following Colonel Nasser's seizure of the Suez Canal. Morrison stood down at the 1959 general election and was made a life peer as Baron Morrison of Lambeth, of Lambeth in the County of London on 2 November 1959. He was appointed President of the British Board of Film Censors.

During 1961–65, Morrison was Director of the FCI News Agency, an organisation reporting on events behind the Iron Curtain and run by exiles from Marxist regimes such as the journalist Josef Josten.

Personal life 
While working in a market garden in Letchworth during World War One, Morrison met his first wife, Margaret Kent (1896–1953), a secretary and daughter of a railway clerk. The couple married on 15 March 1919. His total involvement in politics, however, meant that theirs was not a happy marriage; his later autobiography made no mention of Kent or their daughter, Mary. Morrison had a protracted affair with Labour MP and Minister Ellen Wilkinson, who died in 1947, although views differ as to whether this was a platonic or sexual relationship.

Following Kent's death in July 1953, Morrison married Edith Meadowcroft (b. c.1908), a businesswoman of Conservative politics. The pair married on 6 January 1955 and their relationship appeared much more successful.

Morrison's grandson Peter Mandelson was a cabinet minister in the Labour governments of Tony Blair and Gordon Brown.

Death

He died on 6 March 1965, coincidentally in the same month as the London County Council was abolished.

TV portrayal

Morrison was Foreign Secretary at the time of the defection of the double agents Guy Burgess and Donald Maclean. In the 1977 Granada TV play Philby, Burgess and Maclean by Iain Curteis, Arthur Lowe appeared as Morrison – glowering to the camera in his final shot to show the opaque right lens of his spectacles.

References

Further reading
Herbert Morrison published his Autobiography in 1960. His other publications included:
 Socialisation and Transport, 1933;
 Looking Ahead (wartime speeches), 1933;
 Parliamentary Government in Britain, 1949.

The main biography is:
 Herbert Morrison – Portrait of a Politician (1977), by Bernard Donoughue and George Jones. (Reprinted by Orion with an introduction by Peter Mandelson 2001). 

Biographical essays include:
 Mackintosh, John P. 'Herbert Morrison' in the original Dictionary of National Biography (supplement).
 Morgan, Kenneth O. "Herbert Morrison", in Morgan, Labour people (1987) pp 176–88.
 'Herbert Morrison' by Greg Rosen in Kevin Jefferys (ed) Labour Forces: From Ernie Bevin to Gordon Brown (2002) pp 25–42.

Scholarly studies:
 Berger, Stefan. "Herbert Morrison's London Labour Party in the Interwar Years and the SPD: Problems of Transferring German Socialist Practices to Britain." European Review of History 12.2 (2005): 291–306.
 Hopkins, Michael F. "Herbert Morrison, the Cold War and Anglo-American Relations, 1945–1951." in Cold War Britain, 1945–1964 (Palgrave Macmillan UK, 2003) pp. 17–29.
 Lowe, Peter. "Herbert Morrison, the Labour Government, and the Japanese Peace Treaty, 1951." in Kazuo Chiba, and Peter Lowe, eds. Britain, the United States and Japans Return to Normal, 1951-1972 (Suntory and Toyota International Centres for Economics and Related Disciplines, LSE, 1993). pp 1–27.
 Radice, Giles. The Tortoise and the Hares: Attlee, Bevin, Cripps, Dalton, Morrison (Politico's Publishing, 2008).
 Wring, Dominic. "“Selling socialism”-The marketing of the “very old” British Labour Party." European Journal of Marketing 35#9/10 (2001): 1038–1046. online

External links

 
 Catalogue of the Morrison papers held at LSE Archives
 Herbert Morrison on The Blitz audiobook CD
 
 

1888 births
1965 deaths
British Secretaries of State for Foreign Affairs
British Secretaries of State
British conscientious objectors
British people of World War II
British politicians with disabilities
Chairs of the Labour Party (UK)
Councillors in Greater London
Hackney Members of Parliament
Labour Party (UK) MPs for English constituencies
Labour Party (UK) life peers
Leaders of the House of Commons of the United Kingdom
Lord Presidents of the Council
Members of London County Council
Members of the Order of the Companions of Honour
Members of the Privy Council of the United Kingdom
Ministers in the Churchill wartime government, 1940–1945
Ministers of Supply
People associated with transport in London
People from Lambeth
Secretaries of State for Transport (UK)
Secretaries of State for the Home Department
UK MPs 1923–1924
UK MPs 1929–1931
UK MPs 1935–1945
UK MPs 1945–1950
UK MPs 1950–1951
UK MPs 1951–1955
UK MPs 1955–1959
UK MPs who were granted peerages
Ministers in the Attlee governments, 1945–1951
Life peers created by Elizabeth II
Leaders of the Labour Party (UK)